Manolo Carrasco is a pianist and conductor. He is the author of Real Escuela Andaluza de Arte Ecuestre's music. He has recorded a few albums and is also a developer and performer on tours around Japan, China, the US, Europe and Spain.

Recordings
Arena y Mar
Sueños de Juventud
Clásicos Internacionales
Clásicos Españoles 1
Clasicos Españoles 2
Al-Andalus
Gitana
Passionata Andaluza
Greatest Hits
Banda Sonora Original El cielo podría haber cantado
Cómo bailan los caballos andaluces
Grandes éxitos de Manolo Carrasco
Andaluza de Danza
Gipsy
Dance Andalucia
Between two seas

Notes

References

 El pianista gaditano Manolo Carrasco lleva a Montopellier (Francia) el espectáculo 'Sinfonía Ecuestre' - 20minutos.es
 Conciertos: Manolo Carrasco: Passionata Andaluza- Chiclana: LAVOZDIGITAL.ES
 12 Noticias - Prensa Ciudadana
 Flamenco y espectáculos Antonio Benítez
 espectáculo

External links

 Pianist and Composer official site
 Manolo Carrasco | Vive La Pepa 2012
 Official site
 Eurodeltamusic S.A.
 Centauros Unión
 Eagle records | Manolo Carrasco
 Sinfonía Ecuestre

1971 births
Living people
Spanish pianists
21st-century pianists